The 1867 Wanganui by-election was a by-election held  on 29 April 1867 in the  electorate during the 4th New Zealand Parliament.

The by-election was caused by the resignation of the incumbent, John Bryce, who had resigned because of ill-health.

He was replaced by Henry Shafto Harrison, who had previously represented the district.

Hutchison, who came second, was the editor of The Chronicle.

Result
The following table gives the election result:

References

Wanganui 1867
1867 elections in New Zealand
April 1867 events
Politics of Manawatū-Whanganui